Jan Carstenszoon or more commonly Jan Carstensz  was a 17th-century Dutch explorer. In 1623, Carstenszoon was commissioned by the Dutch East India Company to lead an expedition to the southern coast of New Guinea and beyond, to follow up the reports of land sighted further south in the 1606 voyages of Willem Janszoon in the Duyfken.

Setting sail from Ambon in the Dutch East Indies with two ships, the yacht Pera (captained by Carstenszoon) and Arnhem (captained by Willem Joosten van Colster), the ships travelled along the south coast of New Guinea, then headed south to Cape York Peninsula and the Gulf of Carpentaria. On 14 April 1623, Cape Keerweer was passed. Landing in search of fresh water for his stores, Carstenszoon encountered a party of the local indigenous Australian inhabitants. Carstenszoon described them as "poor and miserable looking people" who had "no knowledge of precious metals or spices".

On 8 May 1623, Carstenszoon and his crew fought a skirmish with 200 Aboriginal people at the mouth of a small river near Cape Duyfken (named after Janszoon's vessel which had earlier visited the region) and landed at the Pennefather River. Carstenszoon named the small river Carpentier River, and the Gulf of Carpentaria in honour of Pieter de Carpentier, at that time Governor-General of the Dutch East Indies. Carstenszoon reached the Staaten River before heading north again. The Pera and Carstenszoon returned to Ambon while the Arnhem crossed the Gulf of Carpentaria, sighting the east coast of Arnhem Land.

Carstensz Pyramid, Irian Jaya, Indonesia was named after him. Carstenszoon sighted the glaciers on the peak of the mountain in 1623 and called it Sneebergh; he was ridiculed in Europe when he said he had seen snow near the equator. Carstenszoon also named several other features along Australia's north coast.

See also
 European exploration of Australia

References

External links 
Dutch explorers and Australia: 1606-1697

17th-century Dutch East Indies people
Explorers of Australia
Explorers of New Guinea
17th-century Dutch explorers
Year of birth unknown
Year of death unknown
Maritime exploration of Australia
Maritime history of the Dutch East India Company